The Monty Python Instant Record Collection is the title of two compilation albums by the Monty Python troupe. The first was released in the UK and Canada in 1977 and drew from the group's first three studio albums, first live album, and first soundtrack album on the Charisma label, while the second was released in the US in 1981 and comprised tracks from their four albums released on the Arista label. Billed as "the pick of the best of some recently repeated Python hits again, Vol. II", the record sleeve was designed by Terry Gilliam. The UK/Canadian version originally featured packaging that folded out into a cardboard box resembling a large stack of record albums (all containing spoofs of popular album names). An inner sleeve featured a spoof "Where Are They Now?" update on the members of the Python team.

As ever, the original vinyl release of the UK version had messages from George Peckham on the runout grooves. The first side read: "DEAR MUM, CUTTING ANOTHER PYTHON RECORD. I'LL BE HOME LATE TONIGHT, LUV PORKY", while the second side read: "SPECIAL RECORD NO. 471. RING CHARISMA FOR YOUR PRIZE NOW!".

The only new sketch (on the UK/Canadian versions) is "Summarise Proust Competition" which was originally performed on the television series Monty Python's Flying Circus and was re-recorded for Monty Python's Previous Record but never used, while the Alistair Cooke sketch is preceded by a brief, newly recorded introduction by Michael Palin. Many of the sketches are edited from their original versions.

Track listing (UK/Canada Version)

Side one
Introductions
Alistair Cooke
Nudge, Nudge
Mrs. Nigger-Baiter
Constitutional Peasants
Fish Licence 
Eric the Half a Bee
Australian Table Wines
Silly Noises
Novel Writing
Elephantoplasty
How To Do It
Gumby Cherry Orchard
Oscar Wilde

Side two
Introduction
Argument
French Taunter
Summarise Proust Competition
Cheese Emporium
Funerals at Prestatyn
Camelot
Word Association
Bruces
Parrot
Monty Python Theme

(note that, like many of the Python albums, the CD version of the album contains only two tracks "Side One" and "Side Two". The individual sketches are not selectable).

Track listing (US Version)

Side one
The Executive Intro
Pet Shop
Nudge Nudge
Premiere of Film - Live Broadcast From London
Bring Out Your Dead
How do you Tell a Witch
Camelot
Argument Clinic
Crunchy Frog
The Cheese Shop
The Phone-In
Sit On My Face

Side two
Another Executive Announcement
Bishop on the Landing
Elephantoplasty
The Lumberjack Song
Bookshop
Blackmail
Farewell to John Denver
World Forum
String
Wide World of Novel Writing
Death of Mary Queen of Scots
Never Be Rude to an Arab

Distribution Information
LP: (1977, 1983) Charisma CAS 1134 (UK), 9211-1134 (Fold-out)/CA-1-2173 (Standard jacket) (Canada)
LP: (1981) Arista Records ALB 68296 (U.S.)
CD: (1989) Virgin Records, Ltd., CASCD 1134 (UK) (budget CD)

Faux album titles listed on packaging 
As mentioned above, the record jacket packaging folds out into the shape of a box, with the actual record sleeve being the lid of the box. The remainder of the box appears as a stack of records (the "instant record collection") with one face of the box displaying all the album titles, as listed here: 
ROCK AND ROLL IS HERE TO STAY AGAIN!
The Beatles Chauffeurs Live!
RUNNING SONGS AND SURRENDERING BALLADS: THE MASSED BANDS OF THE QUEENS OWN COWARDS (OR SOME OF THEM)
ETERNALLY YOURS - THE MASSED WINDSCALE MARCHING SCIENTISTS
Ron Simon and Geoff Garunkel: Live From The Tennis Club Purley (shows as gold lettering on black record jacket)
TOGETHER AGAIN - FRANK AND IFIELD
My Brain Hurts - THE MORON TABERNACLE CHOIR
THE MILKMAN WHISTLES STOCKHAUSEN - 'A' MILKMAN
When We're Apart                                The Legs
Friday Night Is Bath Night, J.P.Gumby
WHEN THE CHICKENS ARE ASLEEP - Ramon And Ted
NIXON'S SOLID GOLD DENIALS
Norma Shearer Whistles Duane Eddie
TEACH YOURSELF POWER
THE BEST BITS OF ROLF HARRIS
MONTY PYTHON'S BEST SKETCHES BEGINNING WITH 'R'
HITTING OURSELVES WITH THE LITTLE CURVED BIT ON THE END OF A SHAVING BRUSH - ERIC AND THE LOONIES
MY BRAIN HURTS AND OTHER NATIONAL FRONT MARCHING SONGS
The Best of the Ozmonds Teeth - Vol XI
An Evening with Martin Bormann (and the Trio los Paraguayos)
A NIGHT IN CASABLANCA - THE EVERLY SISTERS
Ron Simon and Geoff Garfunkel: Live From The Tennis Club Purley (shows as black lettering on cream record jacket)
GIVE ME THE MOONLIGHT AND THE GOATS - RAMON AND TED
A MAN WHO ONCE SOLD PAUL MCARTNEY A NEWSPAPER - LIVE!
RAW POWER PUNK KILL BLAST THROTTLE DESTROY - CLODAGH ROTTEN
THE DAVE CLARK FIVE'S WAR SPEECHES
THE BEST OF REGGAE MAUDLING (RASTATORY LABEL)
The Wonderful Sound of Hip Injuries
BEETHOVEN'S PUNK SYMPHONY, IN B FLAT - "THE STINKING BASTARD" (BANDAGES SUPPLIED)
The Horrid Brothers Kill Anyone in Sight
Party Time, Princess "Piano" Margaret
YOUNG, GIFTED, BLACK AND FURRY: RAMON & TED
My Way Or Else - Frank Sinatra
ITS ALL OVER MY FRIEND - EARL k VOMIT AND THE METABOLIC PROCESSES
John, Paul, George And Ringo - The Davenport Brothers
Scottish Airs - The Hamish McFart Singers
I LEFT MY PACEMAKER IN SAN FRANCISCO - DR DeBAKEY
More Songs from the Goole and District Catholic River Wideners Club
BERNARD DELPONT LIVE AT THE BANK NEXT TO THE LONDON PALLADIUM
BRIGHT LIGHTS, SOFT MUSIC, LIVE GOATS - RAMON & TED
FOOTLOOSE AND FANCY FREE - BRITT ECKLAND
A NIGHT ON THE TOWN - BRITT ECKLAND
SMILER - BRITT ECKLAND
GASOLINE ALLEY - BRITT ECKLAND
NEVER A FULL MOMENT - BRITT ECKLAND
AN OLD RAINCOAT WON'T EVER LET YOU DOWN - BRITT ECKLAND
EVERY PICTURE TELLS A STORY - BRITT ECKLAND (shows as black lettering on a yellow record jacket)
ATLANTIC CROSSING - BRITT ECKLAND
EVERY PICTURE TELLS A STORY - BRITT ECKLAND (shows as white letting on a black record jacket)
RASTAMAN - SIR KEITH JOSEPH (deleted)
I'VE GOT A BEER GLASS STICKING IN MY HEAD AND OTHER RUGBY SONGS
ACCOUNTANTS WORK SONGS
RULING SONGS AND BALLADS - H.M. THE QUEEN AND THE JORDANAIRES
I'M IN THE MOOD FOR LOVE AND GOATS AND CHICKENS: RAMON AND TED
Pet Smells - The Beach Boys
MONTY PYTHON TRIES IT ON AGAIN
BOEING BOEING (cast album)
BONG BANGY BING!
BANG GOES BOING!
BACK IS BING!
BING IS BACK!
Tom Jones Hits Frank Sinatra While Vic Damone And Mel Torme Grab Englebert Humberdink, At Las Vegas
YOU AND THE NIGHT AND THE MUSIC AND THE CHICKEN: RAMON AND TED
Get Bach - The Best Of The Welsh Beatles
THE PIC OF THE BEST OF SOME RECENTLY REPEATED PYTHON HITS AGAIN, VOL II

References 

Instant Record Collection
1977 compilation albums
Arista Records compilation albums
Charisma Records compilation albums
Virgin Records compilation albums
Albums with cover art by Terry Gilliam